Mike Curato is an American writer and illustrator of children's books. His graphic novel, Flamer, received a Lambda Literary Award for Children's and Young Adult Literature in 2021.

Personal life 
Curato was born and raised in the suburbs of New York City and currently lives in Brooklyn.

He received a bachelor of fine arts degree from Syracuse University before moving to Seattle to pursue a career as a graphic designer.

Selected works

Little Elliot series (2014-2018) 

The Little Elliot series follows an elephant named Elliot and consists of five books: Little Elliot, Big City (2015); Little Elliot, Big Family (2015); Little Elliot, Big Fun (2016); Little Elliot, Fall Friends (2017); and Merry Christmas, Little Elliot (2018).

Flamer (2020) 

Flamer is a semi-autobiographical graphic novel, published September 1, 2020 by Henry Holt and Company. The book has received various accolades, including the Lambda Literary Award for Children's and Young Adult Literature in 2021.

Publications

Little Elliot series 

 Little Elliot, Big City, published August 26, 2014 by Henry Holt and Company
 Little Elliot, Big Family, published October 6, 2015 by Henry Holt and Company
 Little Elliot, Big Fun, published August 30, 2016 by Henry Holt and Company
 Little Elliot, Fall Friends, published August 29, 2017 by Henry Holt and Company
 Merry Christmas, Little Elliot, published September 11, 2018 by Henry Holt and Company

Standalone books 

 Flamer, published September 1, 2020 by Henry Holt and Company
 Where is Bina Bear?, expected to be published January 11, 2022 by Henry Holt and Company

Illustrator 

 Worm Loves Worm, written by J. J. Austrian and published January 5th 2016 by Balzer + Bray
 All the Way to Havana, written by Margarita Engle and published August 29, 2017 by Henry Holt and Company
 What If..., written by Samantha Berger and published April 10, 2018 by Little, Brown Books for Young Readers
 Sunny Day: A Celebration of Sesame Street, written by Joe Raposo; illustrated alongside Christian Robinson, Selina Alko, Brigette Barrager, Roger Bradford, Vanessa Brantley-Newton, Ziyue Chen, Joey Chu, Pat Cummings, Leo Espinosa, Tom Lichtenheld, Rafael López, Emily Winfield Martin, Joe Mathieu, Kenard Pak, Greg Pizzoli, Sean Qualls, and Dan Santat; and published October 22, 2019 by Random House Books for Young Readers
 The Power of One: Every Act of Kindness Counts, written by Trudy Ludwig, published August 25, 2020 by Alfred A. Knopf Books for Young Readers
 The Sharey Godmother, written by Samantha Berger and published April 13, 2021 by Imprint
 What Are You? written by Christian Trimmer and expected to be published October 18, 2022 by Roaring Brook Press

References

External links 

 Official website

American children's book illustrators
Writers from New York City
Writers from Brooklyn
Syracuse University alumni

Living people
Year of birth missing (living people)